St. Peter, Wisconsin is an unincorporated census-designated place in the Town of Taycheedah in Fond du Lac County, Wisconsin. It was located on Wisconsin Highway 149 before the highway was decommissioned and turned over to county control as County Highway WH. As of the 2010 census, its population is 1,489.

Holyland

St. Peter is in an area of eastern Fond du Lac County, Wisconsin, and adjacent Calumet County known as "The Holyland", so called because of the large number of villages settled by German immigrants and built around Catholic churches, including St. Anna, St. Cloud, Marytown, Mount Calvary, Johnsburg, Calvary, Brothertown and Jericho.

Notes

Census-designated places in Wisconsin
Census-designated places in Fond du Lac County, Wisconsin